4 North A is a Canadian animated short film, directed by Howie Shia and Jordan Canning and released in 2020. Told without dialogue, the film portrays a woman reflecting on childhood memories as she sits in a hospital room with her dying father.

The film premiered at the 2020 Toronto International Film Festival.

The film received a Canadian Screen Award nomination for Best Animated Short at the 9th Canadian Screen Awards in 2021.

References

External links
 

2020 films
2020 animated films
Canadian animated short films
Films directed by Howie Shia
Films directed by Jordan Canning
National Film Board of Canada animated short films
2020 short films
2020s animated short films
2020s English-language films
2020s Canadian films